Syrian Canadians refers to Canadians who claim Syrian ancestry and newcomers who have Syrian citizenship. According to the 2016 Census, there were 77,050 Syrian Canadians compared to the 2011 Census where there were 50,840.

History
Syrians started immigrating to the Americas in the early part of the 1880s, while the vast majority migrated to South America, a small percentage made their way to America, and an even smaller percentage settled in Canada. The overwhelming majority of Syrians who settled in Canada from the 1880s to 1960s were of the Christian faith. The so-called Shepard of the lost flock, Saint Raphael Hawaweeny of Brooklyn, New York, came to Montreal in 1896 to help establish a Christian association called the Syrian Benevolent Society and then later on an Orthodox church in Montreal for the newly arrived Syrian faithful.

Since Justin Trudeau was elected as Prime Minister of Canada in 2015, over 25,000 Syrian refugees have settled in Canada.

Economic life
The leading factor for the immigration of Syrians has been to find better employment. The early immigrants found themselves engaging in basic commerce, with the term 'peddler' becoming almost synonymous with 'Syrian'. Most of these peddlers were successful, and, with time, and after raising enough capital, some became importers and wholesalers, recruiting newcomers and supplying them with merchandise. Others opened small businesses in urban centers all over the country. Later, these merchants would go towards larger urban locations, where the economy was improving. Smaller number of Syrians worked as laborers in factories, miners, or as plumbers. Also, some became pioneers in the Southern prairie regions of Western Canada, and worked in farming. These workers settled in communities such as Swift Current, Saskatchewan, and Lac La Biche, Alberta. Few reached the Northwest Territories, the best known being Peter Baker, author of the book An Arctic Arab, and later elected as a member of the legislative assembly of the Northwest Territories. By the 1930s, many towns in the Maritimes, Quebec, Ontario, and Western Canada had one or more retail stores run by Syrian immigrants.

Women also worked occasionally, in addition to housekeeping, and usually helped run the family store if they had one, and in the cities they would sell goods from door to door.

Notable Syrian Canadians
Omar Alghabra, Canadian Minister of Transport and Member of Parliament from Mississauga Centre
René Angélil, Canadian singer and manager (father of Syrian descent origin)
Paul Anka, Canadian singer and songwriter (father was Syrian, mother was Lebanese "from the town of Kfarmishki, in Lebanon")
Tony Clement, Canadian Member of Parliament from Parry Sound—Muskoka. Mother of Syrian descent.
Sam Hamad, former Member of the Quebec National Assembly (MNA) for the riding of Louis-Hebert and former Quebec Minister of Employment and Social Solidarity
Jack Kachkar, Syrian Canadian businessman of Armenian descent
Wiz Kilo, Canadian hip hop and R&B artist
Ruba Nadda, Canadian film director of mixed Syrian-Palestinian origin
Rami Sebei, Canadian professional wrestler best known for his work under the ring name El Generico, currently signed to WWE under the ring name Sami Zayn
Sammy Yatim, Canadian shot by a Toronto police officer

Popular culture
Sabah, a 2005 film directed by Ruba Nadda, portrays a Syrian Canadian family in Toronto.

See also

 Arab Canadians
 Lebanese Canadians
 Middle Eastern Canadians
 West Asian Canadians

References

External links

The Syrian Embassy in Ottawa

Syrians
 
Arab Canadian
Asian Canadian
 
Syrian diaspora in North America
West Asian Canadians